Robertos Konstantinos Williams (Greek: Ροβέρτος-Κωνσταντίνος Ουίλιαμς, 4 December 1949 – 21 August 2022), best known as Robert Williams (Greek: Ρόμπερτ Ουίλιαμς), was a Greek singer and composer.

Life and career 
Born in Athens to a British father and a Greek mother, Williams began his career as guitarist and singer of the rock band Poll. He started his solo career in 1974, and in 1976 he had his major hit with the song "Μίλα μου" ("Talk to Me"). In 1977, together with singers Pascalis, Marianna Toli and Bessy Argyraki he entered the Eurovision Song Contest, placing fifth with the song "Mathema Solfege".

Close to New Democracy, he composed the anthem of the party in 1982. He was also active as a score composer. 

Williams died of pancreatic cancer on 21 August 2022, at the age of 72.

References

External links 
  
 

1949 births
2022 deaths 
Singers from Athens
Greek pop singers
Greek male singers
Greek composers
Eurovision Song Contest entrants of 1977
Eurovision Song Contest entrants for Greece
Deaths from pancreatic cancer
Greek people of British descent